Omco is an extinct town in Mineral County, in the U.S. state of Nevada. The GNIS classifies it as a populated place.

The community's name is derived from the Olympic Mines Company.

History 
In 1915, gold was discovered in the area and the Olympic Mine established. A post office was established at Omco in 1917, and remained in operation until 1921. In 1917, the Olympic Mines Company was incorporated, a cyanide plant with capacity of 70 tons was built. The mill burned in 1919 and was rebuilt in 1920. The mill shut down in 1921 after the ore was depleted. On December 20, 1932, the shaft collapsed during an earthquake (See Cedar Mountains (Nevada)). In 1936, the property was in the process of being rehabilitated.

External links 
 Omco (forgottennevada.com)

References 

Ghost towns in Mineral County, Nevada